Decelleria is a monotypic moth genus in the subfamily Lymantriinae erected by Ugo Dall'Asta in 1981. Its only species, Decelleria brachycera, was first described by Cyril Leslie Collenette in 1981. It is found in the Democratic Republic of the Congo.

References

Lymantriinae
Monotypic moth genera
Endemic fauna of the Democratic Republic of the Congo